Linping may refer to:

 Locations in China
 Linping District, in Hangzhou, Zhejiang Province
 Lianping County, in Heyuan, Guangdong Province. Romanised in the Chinese Postal Map as Linping

 Metro stations
 Linping station, Hangzhou Metro
 Linping Road station, Shanghai Metro

 Other
 Lin Bing (also called Lin Ping), female giant panda in Thailand